Nubsella zeaxanthinifaciens is a Gram-negative, strictly aerobic and rod-shaped bacterium from the genus of Nubsella which has been isolated from freshwater in Misasa in Japan. Nubsella zeaxanthinifaciens produces zeaxanthin.

References

External links
Type strain of Nubsella zeaxanthinifaciens at BacDive -  the Bacterial Diversity Metadatabase

Sphingobacteriia
Bacteria described in 2008